Berberis aemulans is a shrub endemic to the region of Sichuan in southern China. It grows there in thickets and on slopes at elevations of 2900–3200 m.

Berberis aemulans is a deciduous shrub up to 2 m tall, with spines along the branches. Leaves are simple, elliptical to ovate, up to 4 cm long, lighter in color on the underside because of a waxy layer. Flowers are in simple racemes of only a few flowers. Berries egg-shaped, orange, up to 16 mm long.

References

Flora of Sichuan
Plants described in 1917
aemulans